Terence White may refer to:

 T. H. White (1906–1964), author 
 Terence de Vere White (1912–1994), writer and lawyer
 Snowy White (born 1948), real name Terence Charles White; guitarist
 Terry White (born 1936), Australian pharmacist, businessman and politician
 Terry White (sprint canoeist) (born 1955)